Edgar Warren Hymer (February 25, 1906 – March 25, 1948) was an American theatre and film actor.

Early life 
He was born in New York City. His father, John Bard Hymer (1875/1876 – 1953) was a playwright (with nine Broadway plays to his credit, according to the Internet Broadway Database), vaudeville writer and actor, while his mother, Eleanor Kent, was an actress.

Career 
He appeared in 129 films between 1929 and 1946, as well as the 1928 Broadway play The Grey Fox. 
Despite his typical screen persona as an unsophisticated tough guy with a Brooklyn accent, he actually attended Yale University. 

In the late 1930s, Columbia Pictures head Harry Cohn had him removed from the studio after he showed up for work drunk. Hymer responded by breaking into Cohn's office and urinating on his desk. Cohn then blackballed him in the film industry, making it hard for him to find work.

Death 
He died in Los Angeles, California, reportedly of a "stomach ailment" at age 42 in 1948. His remains are interred at Chapel of the Pines Crematory.

Filmography

 The Far Call (1929) - Soup Brophy (silent)
 Speakeasy (1929) - Cannon Delmont
 Fox Movietone Follies of 1929 (1929) - Martin
 The Cock-Eyed World (1929) - Marine Corporal Scout (uncredited)
 The Girl from Havana (1929) - Spike Howard
 Frozen Justice (1929) - Bartender
 The Lone Star Ranger (1930) - Bowery Kid
 Men Without Women (1930) - Kaufman
 Born Reckless (1930) - Big Shot
 Up the River (1930) - Dannemora Dan
 Sinners' Holiday (1930) - Mitch
 Oh, For a Man! (1930) - 'Pug' Morini
 Men on Call (1930) - Joe Burke
 The Seas Beneath (1931) - 'Lug' Kaufman
 Charlie Chan Carries On (1931) - Max Minchin
 Goldie (1931) - Spike Moore
 The Spider (1931) - Schmidt (uncredited)
 The Unholy Garden (1931) - Smiley Corbin
 Love is a Racket (1932) - Burney Olds
 The Night Mayor (1932) - Riley
 Hold 'Em Jail (1932) - Steele
 One Way Passage (1932) - Steve Burke
 Madison Square Garden (1932) - Brassie Randall
 20,000 Years in Sing Sing (1932) - Hype
 The Billion Dollar Scandal (1932) - Kid McGurn
 The Mysterious Rider (1933) - Jitney Smith
 A Lady's Profession (1933) - Nutty Bolton
 Midnight Mary (1933) - Angelo
 I Love That Man (1933) - Mousey
 Her First Mate (1933) - Percy
 My Woman (1933) - Al—Butler (uncredited)
 In the Money (1933) - Gunboat Bimms
 King for a Night (1933) - Goofy
 Roast Beef and Movies (1934, Short) - Man at Gunpoint in Fictitious Film Scene (uncredited)
 The Crosby Case (1934) - Sam Collins
 The Gold Ghost (1934, Short) - Bugs Kelly
 George White's Scandals (1934) - Pete Pandos - Greek Wrestler
 Woman Unafraid (1934) - John
 One Is Guilty (1934) - 'Knock-Out' Walters
 Little Miss Marker (1934) - Canvas Back
 The Cat's-Paw (1934) - 'Spike' Slattery
 She Loves Me Not (1934) - Mugg Schnitzel
 Young and Beautiful (1934) - The Champion
 Belle of the Nineties (1934) - St. Louis Fighter
 Kid Millions (1934) - Louie the Lug
 The Gilded Lily (1935) - Taxi Driver
 The Case of the Curious Bride (1935) - Oscar Pender
 Hold 'Em Yale (1935) - Sam, The Gonoph
 Silk Hat Kid (1935) - Misty
 The Daring Young Man (1935) - Pete Hogan
 Dante's Inferno (1935) - Bozo - a Stoker (uncredited)
 She Gets Her Man (1935) - Spike
 Navy Wife (1935) - Butch
 Our Little Girl (1935)
 Confidential (1935) - 'Midget' Regan
 Hong Kong Nights (1935) - Wally
 Show Them No Mercy! (1935) - Gimp
 The Widow from Monte Carlo (1935) - Dopey Mullins
 Hitch Hike Lady (1935) - Cluck Regan
 The Leavenworth Case (1936) - Detective O'Malley
 Tango (1936) - Joe Sloan, Betty's Boyfriend
 King of the Islands (1936, Short) - A Shipwrecked Sailor
 Laughing Irish Eyes (1936) - Tiger O'Keefe
 Everybody's Old Man (1936) - Mike Murphy
 Mr. Deeds Goes to Town (1936) - Bodyguard (uncredited)
 A Message to Garcia (1936) - Departing Sailor (uncredited)
 Desert Justice (1936) - Hymie
 Nobody's Fool (1936) - Sour Puss
 San Francisco (1936) - Hazeltine
 Rhythm on the Range (1936) - Big Brain
 36 Hours to Kill (1936) - Hazy
 Love Letters of a Star (1936) - Chuck
 You Only Live Once (1937) - Buggsy
 She's Dangerous (1937) - Herman Valentz
 Join the Marines (1937) - Herman
 Navy Blues (1937) - Gerald 'Biff' Jones
 We Have Our Moments (1937) - Smacksey
 Married Before Breakfast (1937) - Harry
 Meet the Boyfriend (1937) - Wilbur 'Bugs' Corrigan
 Wake Up and Live (1937) - First Gunman
 Sea Racketeers (1937) - Mate 'Spud' Jones
 Bad Guy (1937) - 'Shorty'
 Ali Baba Goes to Town (1937) - Tramp
 Telephone Operator (1937) - Shorty
 Lady Behave! (1937) - Butch
 Bluebeard's Eighth Wife (1938) - Kid Mulligan
 Arson Gang Busters (1938) - Tom Jones
 Joy of Living (1938) - Mike
 You and Me (1938) - Gimpy
 Gateway (1938) - Guard-Waiter
 Submarine Patrol (1938) - Seaman Rocky Haggerty
 Thanks for Everything (1938) - Marine Sergeant
 The Lady and the Mob (1939) - Frankie O'Fallon
 Mr. Moto in Danger Island (1939) - Twister McGurk
 Boy Friend (1939) - Greenberg
 Coast Guard (1939) - Lancelot O'Hara
 Calling All Marines (1939) - Snooker
 Destry Rides Again (1939) - Bugs Watson
 Charlie McCarthy, Detective (1939) - Dutch
 I Can't Give You Anything But Love, Baby (1940) - Big Foot Louie
 Love, Honor, and Oh Baby! (1940) - Bull
 Meet John Doe (1941) - Angelface
 Reaching for the Sun (1941) - Percy Shelley
 Buy Me That Town (1941) - Crusher Howard
 Birth of the Blues (1941) - Limpy
 Skylark (1941) - Big Man in Subway Car
 Torpedo Boat (1942) - Marine
 Jail House Blues (1942) - Big Foot Louie
 Mr. Wise Guy (1942) - Dratler
 Girls' Town (1942) - Joe
 So's Your Aunt Emma (1942) - Joe
 Dr. Broadway (1942) - Maxie the Goat
 She's in the Army (1942) - Cpl. Buck Shane
 One Thrilling Night (1942) - Pat Callahan
 Henry and Dizzy (1942) - Tramp at Picnic
 Lure of the Islands (1942) - Albert, a gendarme
 Baby Face Morgan (1942) - Wise Willie
 Police Bullets (1942) - Gabby Walsh
 Phantom Killer (1942) - Police Sgt. Pete Corrigan
 Hitler – Dead or Alive (1942) - Hans 'Dutch' Havermann
 Spy Train (1943) - Herman Krantz
 Danger! Women at Work (1943) - Pete
 Gangway for Tomorrow (1943) - Pete
 Government Girl (1943) - Military Police Sergeant (uncredited)
 Since You Went Away (1944) - Convalescent Wishing for Tutti Frutti (uncredited)
 Three Is a Family (1944) - Coolie
 The Affairs of Susan (1945) - Waiter (uncredited)
 Joe Palooka, Champ (1946) - Ira Eyler
 Gentleman Joe Palooka (1946) - Louie - Sparring Partner

References

External links

1906 births
1948 deaths
American male film actors
Male actors from New York City
20th-century American male actors
Yale University alumni
Burials at Chapel of the Pines Crematory